State Route 795 (SR 795) is an east–west state highway in northwestern Ohio, a U.S. state. The western terminus of SR 795 is at US 20 in Perrysburg, at the signalized intersection that doubles as the northern terminus of SR 199.

SR 795, which was created in the late 1930s, serves a number of small towns in northern Wood County.  From just west of its interchange with I-75 near Perrysburg to just west of its interchange with I-280 near Walbridge, the route is a four-lane divided highway. This four-lane section is used as an alternative to the Ohio Turnpike.  In 2005 and 2006, SR 795 was one of the main detour routes for I-280 during the construction of the Maumee River Crossing. Along its path, SR 795 passes close to Toledo Executive Airport, a small airport near Walbridge.

Route description

SR 795 runs through the northeastern corner of Wood County and a small portion of western Ottawa County.  The segment of SR 795 that runs between I-75 and I-280 is included within the National Highway System, a system of highways that are determined to be the most important for the economy, mobility and defense of the country.

History
SR 795 was designated in 1937. It was routed approximately along its current alignment between US 20 in Perrysburg and the former SR 102 (current SR 51) near Millbury.  By 1971, the stretch of SR 795 from just west of I-75 to just west of the I-280 interchange was upgraded from two lanes to a four-lane divided expressway.  This upgrade included the construction of viaducts over a pair of parallel railyards,  as well as a parclo interchange at East Broadway Street (which previously conveyed the route between Indiana Avenue and Moline-Martin Road) in Moline.

Major intersections

References

External links

795
Transportation in Wood County, Ohio
Transportation in Ottawa County, Ohio